Weikman Nunataks are two nunataks on the divide separating the upper reaches of Balchen Glacier and Crevasse Valley Glacier, in the Ford Ranges of Marie Byrd Land. The nunataks lie 2 nautical miles (3.7 km) east of Mount Perkins. First mapped by the United States Antarctic Service (USAS), 1939–41. Named by Advisory Committee on Antarctic Names (US-ACAN) for Edward R. Weikman Jr., CMH2, U.S. Navy, Construction Mechanic at Byrd Station, 1967.

Nunataks of Marie Byrd Land